Capital punishment in Costa Rica was abolished in 1877. Costa Rica was one of five countries to abolish the death penalty for all crimes prior to the beginning of the 20th century.

Costa Rica and the United States signed an extradition treaty on November 10, 1922 that addresses the death penalty as imposed by the two nations. The treaty generally forbids Costa Rica from surrendering any criminal who would face the death sentence in the United States.

References

1877 disestablishments
Costa Rica
Death in Costa Rica
Human rights abuses in Costa Rica
Law of Costa Rica
Social issues in Costa Rica